District School 2 is a historic one room school building located at Coventryville in Chenango County, New York. It is a one-story, wood-frame building on a cut stone foundation built in 1852.  It is three bays wide and two bays deep with a broad gable roof.

It was added to the National Register of Historic Places in 2004.

References

School buildings on the National Register of Historic Places in New York (state)
School buildings completed in 1852
One-room schoolhouses in New York (state)
Schoolhouses in the United States
Buildings and structures in Chenango County, New York
National Register of Historic Places in Chenango County, New York
1852 establishments in New York (state)